Tammy Lynne Stoner (October 26, 1968) is an American writer and artist. She created the first children's program for kids in gay families, Dottie's Magic Pockets. She is the publisher of Gertrude Press and GERTIE and is the author of Sugar Land. She lives in Portland, Oregon, with her wife and three children.

Personal life 
Stoner was born in Midland, Texas, and lived in El Paso, Texas, and Gulfport, Mississippi, before her family settled in Mechanicsburg, Pennsylvania. After attending twelve years of Catholic school, she left for West Chester University, where she met the woman she would marry 20 years later.

Stoner put herself through college at Temple University by working as an artists’ model, a paid medical experimentee, a waitress at a Greek diner, a house cleaner, a biscuit maker, and a book store manager. While in Philadelphia, she started Shrink-Wrap literary and art journal with her boyfriend, was published several times, and played in a band who practiced secretly at the Mummers Museum. After graduation, she moved from Philadelphia to Austin, Texas, where she worked as a gas station attendant and in print production.

In 1995, Stoner moved to South Korea. She taught English in Busan for a year before resettling in the Tenderloin in San Francisco in 1996. The following year she moved to Southern California where she lived for ten years, working as a print production manager at Liberation Publications, parent company of The Advocate, Out, HIV+, and Alyson Books until she left to have a baby with her girlfriend. Her pregnancy led to the final break with her religious parents.

In 2007, Stoner earned her M.F.A from Antioch University. That same year, Stoner split amicably from her girlfriend. They then moved to Portland, Oregon, with their son. In 2008, Stoner reunited with her college girlfriend, Karena Meehan, who was living in Paris. Meehan moved to Portland to be with Stoner. Three years later they were married, and had twin girls in 2014.

Creative work 
In 2006, Stoner's son asked her why no families on kids' TV had two mommies, inspiring Stoner to write Dottie's Magic Pockets. Dottie was directed by her friend from Sony Pictures, Andrea Maxwell, and stars Jennifer Plante. It was released in 2007 to much media buzz and played at numerous gay and lesbian film festivals including London, Melbourne, Toronto, Outfest, and Frameline. Now, Dottie is in 100+ libraries in the United States and Canada.

From 2011-2014, Stoner was the fiction editor for Gertrude Journal, a queer literary and arts journal based in Portland, Oregon, and took over as publisher in 2017. Stoner also wrote several short films, including being on staff for Second Shot, starring Jill Bennett, who she had also collaborated with in the LA drag king troupe, the Sugar Daddy show (2000–2003), with Stoner as Frankie Roundfirmenhigh.

Stoner's shorter literary writing has appeared in two dozen journals and anthologies. She's been nominated for a Million Writers Award and two Pushcarts. Stoner was an Artist-in-Resident with Sou'Wester and a writing fellow with the VCCA. In 2018, her first novel, Sugar Land, was released by Red Hen Press and went on to win an IPPY Award and be a finalist in the Forewords Book of the Year Award 2018., and short-listed for others, including the Crooks Corner Book Prize.

Sugar Land has been called a "ravishing debut" in a starred Kirkus Review, "writing at its finest" by the New York Journal of Books, and "surprising and exhilarating" by Booklist. Bookpage wrote, "a novel of exploration, bravery and redemption, with keen insight into race, class, gender identity and social norms, Sugar Land is the story of a woman learning to come home to herself."

She is now developing "Sugar Land" into a TV series, alongside other film projects.

In 2019, Stoner appeared on an episode of Storytellers Telling Stories, reading an excerpt from Sugar Land, accompanied by Americana duo Pretty Gritty.

See also
 List of LGBT people from Portland, Oregon

References

External links 
 Official website
 
 iHeart Radio interview, 2019
 KBOO radio interview, 2019
 Hasty Booklist interview, 2018
 Entrophy 2017 Interview
 After Ellen 2010 Interview
 Portland Monthly 2008 Interview with Tammy Stoner

1968 births
Living people
Artists from Portland, Oregon
Writers from Portland, Oregon
American women children's writers
American children's writers
American lesbian writers
LGBT people from Oregon
People from Midland, Texas
Writers from Texas
West Chester University alumni
Temple University alumni
Antioch University alumni
21st-century American writers
21st-century American women writers